Masam Masam Manis (English: Sweet and Sour) is a 1965 Malaysian comedy film directed by and starring P. Ramlee.

Plot
The story takes place in Kuala Lumpur in 1965. This story is about a teacher, Sha'ari who is also a musician at night and Norkiah, a young woman who rent the room next to his. Usually, Sha'ari and Norkiah worked at the nightclub with the latter with her friend, Mariani, who is also a dancer. Both were frequently quarrel about their matters and annoys each other, with one scene Norkiah flew the portrait to the wrong person instead of Sha'ari, causing a massive fighting between the room occupants. In the next day after the performance, while teaching Bahasa Melayu, he asks students to saying Cikgu suka main bola, hari-hari cikgu main bola (lit. My teacher likes to play ball everyday.) one by one, one of them mistook the sentence and changed to ...Hari-hari cikgu..tidur. Cikgu sudah tidur mari kita main (...Everyday..he sleeps. My teacher is sleeping. Let's go and play), referring to Sha'ari's lack of sleeping. Everyone in class went to go play without his authority and prompts a headmaster, Mohd Basar Muhammad inspects him. Mohd Basar later spots Sha'ari sleeps during his time and bought him to his room. He asks Sha'ari that he had violating rules as a civilian by partying at night club during the weekdays, as well as in Islam that such activities is prohibited as it would nears him to possessing dangerous acts like drunk everyday, if alcoholic drinks were served. At the end, he promised not to perform at night clubs again on weekday nights. One day, while on a bus, Sha'ari helps Norkiah to retrieve her stolen purse. They fall in love with each other, unaware that they still quarrel in the two rooms they occupied. Norkiah lies to Sha'ari, telling him that she works as a teacher at a cooking school at night. By that time, Norkiah has already started singing at the club where she was working. One day, Norkiah's mother and brother came to visit her. Sha'ari ignores the old woman and her young son. While Norkiah, unknown to Sha'ari as his own irritating neighbour, is forced to take her mother and brother out shopping, thus, unable to meet Sha'ari as promised. Later, when Norkiah gets home, she tries to dry her clothes by hanging them on a pole which crosses over to Sha'ari's room. Sha'ari gets fed up and pushes the pole down. Norkiah gets even by drenching him with a pail of water. Sha'ari climbs up the wall to give her a piece of his mind only to find out that Norkiah is the woman that he has fallen in love with. They get married. Sha'ari proposes that Norkiah quits her job, but she could not due to her contract. One night, Sha'ari receives an invitation to perform at the club where he used to work. There, somebody suggested that he sings with a female night club singer called Norkiah Hanum. Curious, Sha'ari goes to the other club only to find out that his wife is a singer and not a teacher as she had claimed. Sha'ari gets upset and starts to build a wall separating their rooms like they used to. Norkiah tries to apologise, but he insults her by calling her a cabaret singer of low class. Norkiah's friends try to trick Sha'ari into believing that Norkiah is now divorcing Sha'ari and having an affair with her colleague, Rashid, played by Mahmud June. Sha'ari kicks Norkiah's door open only to find that Norkiah is alone with a tape recorder. He apologises and they get back together again. The story ends with Sha'ari promoted as a headmaster of his school and has five pairs of twins with Norkiah.

Cast
 P. Ramlee as Teacher Sha'ari Suleiman 
 Sharifah Hanim as Norkiah Hanum
 Mariani Ismail as Rosnah
 Mahmud June as Rashid
 Minah Hashim as Mak Minah
 Raden Sudiro as Taxi Drivers
 Chik as Mother Norkiah
 Adik Murad as Hashim (Norkiah's younger brother)
 Idris Hashim as Mohd Basar bin Muhammad (Headmaster)
 Sharif Babu as Bag Snatcher
 Nordin bin Hanafi as Head of Class
 Tuan Haji Abdul Razak Ayub as Student Leader

Songs
 Saat Yang Bahagia
 Ku Rindu Padamu
 Dalam Ayer Ku Terbayang Wajah
 Perwira by Saloma
 Ai Ai Twist

See also
 P. Ramlee
 List of P. Ramlee films

References

External links
 

1965 films
1965 musical comedy films
Malay-language films
Malaysian musical comedy films
Malaysian black-and-white films
Films directed by P. Ramlee
Films about social class
Films with screenplays by P. Ramlee
Films scored by P. Ramlee
Merdeka Film Productions films
Films set in Kuala Lumpur
Films set in schools
Films shot in Kuala Lumpur